Düden Waterfalls are a group of waterfalls in the province of Antalya, Turkey. They end where the waters of the Lower Düden Falls drop off a rocky cliff directly into the Mediterranean Sea.

A group of Düden Waterfalls consists of two waterfalls, Upper Düden Waterfalls and Lower Düden Waterfalls.

Upper Düden Waterfalls

Location and access
The waterfalls has the following geo coordinates: . The entrance to the park with the waterfalls is located at 21. Cd. road in Şelale Mahallesi.

Gallery

Lower Düden Waterfalls

Location and access
The waterfalls has the following geo coordinates: . The waterfalls is located in Düden Park.

Düdenbaşı Waterfall karstic system 
At the 28th and 30th kilometre markers of the old route from Antalya-Burdur (which goes through Döşemealtı town), two big karstic sources appear. These sources, Kırkgözler and Pınarbaşı, merge after a short flow and disappear into Bıyıklı Sinkhole. Some of the sinkholes can swallow a river or lake. In this region, the Suğla (Konya) big sinkhole and the Bıyıklı sinkhole output . This quantity is the output of Kırkgöz and Pınarbaşı springs at inundation.

The water, which disappears at Bıyıklı Sinkhole, travels  underground and comes out again at Varsak pit. After a very short fall, it disappears again from the other end. The water which disappears at Varsak goes underground for 2 km (1.2 mi) and comes out again at Düdenbasi, by pressure made by a syphon. The water which falls from Düdenbasi is the water coming from Kepez Hydroelectrical Complex.

A regulator built in front of the Bıyıklı Sinkhole directs the waters of Kırkgözler and Pınarbaşı into a canal to the Kepez Hydroelectric Plant, where a pressure pipe carries it to a balancing funnel and drops it over the plant's turbines.

The water from the plant's discharge unit is brought to Düdenbaşı again by a long canal, where it forms artificial cascades. From there the amount of water is that of a large river. Seven irrigation trenches distribute the water to land north-east of Antalya.

After Düdenbasi, the waters of Düdençay separate into a number of streams and finally, east of Antalya, cascade  from a platform into the Mediterranean. A park surrounds these waterfalls. They can be seen from the sea by taking a boat trip from Antalya yacht harbour.

See also
 The Düden River

References

External links 

 Antalya and Waterfalls

Waterfalls of Turkey
Tourist attractions in Antalya
Landforms of Antalya Province